The Taking of Beverly Hills is a 1991 American action film directed by Sidney J. Furie and starring Ken Wahl, Matt Frewer, Harley Jane Kozak and Robert Davi.  In the film, football hero Boomer Hayes (Wahl) battles a group of ex-cops, who are using a chemical spill as a front to rob several homes and bank vaults in Beverly Hills. The film also features Pamela Anderson in her first film part in an uncredited role playing a cheerleader.

Plot
One night in Beverly Hills, California, a truck carrying hazardous materials crashes, releasing a deadly chemical. The citizens of Beverly Hills are sent to quarantine in a hotel in Century City, while the police and the EPA agents stay behind to keep an eye on the valuables and clean up the town.

However, the spill is a cleverly executed hoax masterminded by the head of L.A.'s football team, Robert "Bat" Masterson. The police officers and DEA agents are bitter ex-cops eager for a piece of what the citizens have hoarded from them. Within the 70 minutes that it will take for the National Guard to arrive, they plot to loot every home and business in the city.

However, one man has been forgotten in the rush to get everyone out. Aging football player David "Boomer" Hayes was in his hot tub, expecting to get lucky, when his lady friend, Laura Sage went to see what was going on and was taken in the rush to evacuate everyone. The officers thought that "Boomer" was her dog, but checked anyway. After taking care of one of the cops sent to kill him, Boomer is trapped in the hot tub by an officer, but before he can shoot him, he's shot from behind. Ed Kelvin, a cop in on the whole thing but disgusted by the ruthless murder of the Mayor (he was told there would be no killing), fills in Boomer on the whole situation, and Boomer decides to help bring in the real police, who are locked in the station's hazmat suit room. Donning his jersey, injecting cortizone for his bum knee, and enlisting Kelvin's help, Boomer will spend the next 70 minutes attempting to stop the robbery and bring Masterson to justice, while evading ex-cops and the hired thug Benitez, who has commandeered a SWAT tank and is gunning for Boomer and Kelvin.

Cast
 Ken Wahl as David "Boomer" Hayes
 Matt Frewer as Officer Ed Kelvin
 Harley Jane Kozak as Laura Sage
 Robert Davi as Robert "Bat" Masterson
 Lee Ving as Varney
 Branscombe Richmond as Benitez
 Lyman Ward as Chief Healy
 George Wyner as the Mayor of Beverly Hills
 William Prince as Mitchell Sage
 Michael Bowen as L.A. Cop at Roadblock
 Tony Ganios as EPA Man
 Michael Alldredge as Dispatch Sergeant
 Raymond Singer as Mr. Tobeason
 Pamela Anderson as Cheerleader (uncredited)

Release
The film was picked up for theatrical distribution by Columbia Pictures, which slotted the film for May 1991 before pulling it from the schedule. It was eventually given a limited release in the fall of 1991, grossing $939,277 at the box office on a budget of $19 million. Despite Wahl's presence, and due to rather lackluster advertising, the film bombed on this initial release, but later found an audience when the film was released on VHS.

Computer game
A computer game was developed by Off The Wall Productions and released by Capstone Software in 1991 to coincide with the film's theatrical release. The game was an action/adventure hybrid where you could play as both Boomer Hayes and Laura Sage (strangely, Ed was left out) to solve puzzles and defeat bad guys in order to stop the looting of the city.

References

External links 
 
 
The Taking of Beverly Hills multimedia at MGM.com

1991 films
1991 action thriller films
American action thriller films
Columbia Pictures films
1990s English-language films
Films directed by Sidney J. Furie
1990s American films